Alexandru Jicul (born 23 January 1982) is a Moldovan professional football player. In 2009, he played in the Russian Second Division for FC Sheksna Cherepovets. He also holds Russian citizenship.

External links
 Career summary at sportbox.ru
Profile at Moldova Sports

1982 births
Living people
Moldovan footballers
Moldovan expatriate footballers
Expatriate footballers in Russia
Association football forwards
FC Sheksna Cherepovets players